Balsas is a canton in El Oro Province, Ecuador. Its seat is Balsas.

It is the location of one of three official border crossings into Peru. The name, Balsas, refers to the balsa wood rafts that travellers used to take over the river to make the crossing, though there is now a bridge spanning the river. This is the least used of the Ecuador:Peru border crossings, but is recommended as an adventurous option in Lonely Planet's South America On A Shoestring.

Population: 6861

Demographics
Ethnic groups as of the Ecuadorian census of 2010:
Mestizo  86.2%
White  6.2%
Montubio  4.7%
Afro-Ecuadorian  2.8%
Indigenous  0.0%
Other  0.1%

References

Cantons of El Oro Province